Katghora is one of the 90 Legislative Assembly constituencies of Chhattisgarh state in India. It is in Korba district and is a part of Korba (Lok Sabha constituency).

Members of Legislative Assembly

Election results

2018

See also
List of constituencies of the Chhattisgarh Legislative Assembly
Korba district

References

Korba district
Assembly constituencies of Chhattisgarh